Marathia or Marathea (Greek: Μαραθιά or Μαραθέα) may refer to the following places in Greece:

Marathia, Evrytania, a village in the western part of Evrytania
Marathea, Elis, a village of Amaliada in Elis
Marathea, Karditsa, a village in the northern part of the Karditsa regional unit